Thomas J. Christensen is an American political scientist. He is the James T. Shotwell Professor of International Relations at the School of International and Public Affairs, Columbia University.

Biography 
Christensen received his B.A. with honors from Haverford College, M.A. in International Relations from the University of Pennsylvania, and Ph.D. in political science from Columbia University. Among his advisers at Columbia was Robert Jervis. His research interests include international relations, security, and the international relations of East Asia. He coined the terms Chain ganging and Buck passing in international relations with Jack Snyder.

From 2006 to 2008, he also served as Deputy Assistant Secretary of State for East Asian and Pacific Affairs.

Christensen taught at Cornell University, Massachusetts Institute of Technology, Princeton University, where he co-founded the China in the World program with Harvard professor Alastair Ian Johnston in 2004. He was the William P. Boswell Professor of World Politics of Peace and War at Princeton before joining the Columbia faculty in fall 2018. He also sits on the faculty of the Weatherhead East Asian Institute at Columbia.

He has been described as a China expert by numerous Chinese and American publications. Gideon Rose called his views on the international system as neorealist.

Christensen served as a founding member of the Academic Advisory Council of the Schwarzman Scholars program. He was also a silver medalist of the 2016 Arthur Ross Book Award from the Council on Foreign Relations.

In 2020, Christensen, along with over 130 other former Republican national security officials, signed a statement that asserted that President Trump was unfit to serve another term, and "To that end, we are firmly convinced that it is in the best interest of our nation that Vice President Joe Biden be elected as the next President of the United States, and we will vote for him."

References 

Living people
Haverford College alumni
University of Pennsylvania alumni
Columbia Graduate School of Arts and Sciences alumni
Cornell University faculty
Massachusetts Institute of Technology faculty
Princeton University faculty
Columbia University faculty
American political scientists
American academic administrators
Year of birth missing (living people)
Weatherhead East Asian Institute faculty
Columbia School of International and Public Affairs faculty